Teratoneura isabellae, the western Isabella, is a butterfly in the family Lycaenidae. It is found in Sierra Leone, Ivory Coast, southern Nigeria and Cameroon. The habitat consists of forests.

Adults are on wing from December to March. They have been recorded feeding from the secretions of ant-attended coccids in the trees on which larvae are found.

The larvae are associated with an ant species of the genus Crematogaster. The larvae were found on the bark of Alstonia congoensis and on a species of Ficus.

References

 Seitz, A. Die Gross-Schmetterlinge der Erde 13: Die Afrikanischen Tagfalter. Plate XIII 65 c

Butterflies described in 1909
Poritiinae